Melissa Manchester is the self-titled and the eighth album release by singer-songwriter Melissa Manchester issued on Arista Records the first week of October 1979.

Writing and recording 
Although it was reported in August 1979 that Manchester was recording a followup to her 1978 release Don't Cry Out Loud with the title cut's producer Harry Maslin at Cherokee Studios, the tracks on the Melissa Manchester album were all recorded at Web IV Studios in Atlanta in September 1979 with local producer Steve Buckingham, who had had massive success with the first single he'd produced: "I Love the Nightlife" by Alicia Bridges. Buckingham recalls that when the success of the Bridges single failed to secure him offers for further production work, he began cold calling record companies, and that Arista Records was the second label he called. As a result, Buckingham met with Arista president Clive Davis in New York City. After four hours of appraising tracks Davis played for him, Buckingham was told, "If you have a hit song, call us." After Buckingham sent Davis the demo for the song "Fire in the Morning", Davis assigned Buckingham to produce Manchester's eighth album.

Following Manchester's 1977 cover album, Singin'..., and the 1978 album, Don't Cry Out Loud, which was mostly original material (despite the Top Ten hit title cut not being written by Manchester), the Melissa Manchester album featured five Manchester originals and five tracks of outside material. The songs written by Manchester included two collaborations with Carole Bayer Sager, who had been Manchester's regular lyricist for over five years: the tracks "It's All in the Sky Above" and "How Does It Feel Right Now". "I Know Your Love Won't Let Me Down" reunited Manchester with lyricist Adrienne Anderson, a regular collaborator in the first phase of Manchester's recording career, while "Lights of Dawn" - written by solely by Manchester - featured a newly written lyric to the tune of a song written and set aside five years before. The Melissa Manchester album also featured Manchester's own version of the Kenny Loggins hit she'd co-written: "Whenever I Call You Friend", which Manchester recorded as a duet with Arnold McCuller.

Release and promotion 
Despite the favorable impression the track had made on Davis, "Fire in the Morning" was passed over for lead single with "Pretty Girls" being released three weeks prior in advance of the album. "Pretty Girls" was the first upbeat single to preview a Melissa Manchester album and besides its standard 7-inch 45 issue, the track served as Manchester's extended dance single debut. Although Manchester would have her biggest hit with the dance track "You Should Hear How She Talks About You" in 1982, her first foray into disco music with "Pretty Girls" barely translated into Top 40 success, as the single peaked at #39 on the Billboard Hot 100. "Fire in the Morning" was released as the second single and fared well in the easy listening market which had been the mainstay of Manchester's support. The track - featuring Paul Davis on harmony vocals - reached #8 on the A/C without significantly boosting Manchester's Top 40 profile, as its Hot 100 peak was #32.

Without producing a Top 30 single, the Melissa Manchester album evidenced a drop in the singer's popularity from the precedent Don't Cry Out Loud album, with Melissa Manchester peaking at #63 as opposed to #33. However Manchester would re-team with producer Steve Buckingham for the subsequent For the Working Girl album (1980) before scoring a 1982 comeback with the Hey Ricky album and the #5 single "You Should Hear How She Talks About You" produced by Arif Mardin. Neither of the singles from the Melissa Manchester album was featured on Manchester's 1983 Greatest Hits album, although it did feature the Melissa Manchester track "Whenever I Call You Friend".

It’s also important to mention that this was one of her most commercial efforts to date with tracks all designed for radio play. Between the singles Pretty Girls and Fire In The Morning, some FM radio stations picked out other tracks like When We Loved, Don’t Want A Heartache and I Know Your Love Won’t Let Me Down while the beautiful Lights Of Dawn became a favorite of her fans.

The 2007 reissue of the Melissa Manchester album by Wounded Bird Records augmented the original track listing with three bonus tracks: the single mix of "O Heaven (How You've Changed Me)" (which was later re-recorded in a different style for the singer's 1974 album Bright Eyes), "We Had This Time" which was the B-side of the "Don't Cry Out Loud" single, and "Nice Girls" a Steve Buckingham composition introduced on Manchester's 1983 Greatest Hits album ("Nice Girls" had charted at #41).

Track listing
 "Pretty Girls" (Lisa Dalbello) - 3:50
 "Fire in the Morning" (Gary Harju, Larry Helbstritt, Steve Dorff) - 3:49
 "Don't Want a Heartache" (Gerard Cohen, Jason Darrow) - 3:46
 "When We Loved" (Mickey Buckins, Randy McCormick) - 4:10
 "It's All in the Sky Above" (Carole Bayer Sager, Melissa Manchester) - 4:15
 "How Does It Feel Right Now" (Carole Bayer Sager, Melissa Manchester) - 3:54
 "Whenever I Call You Friend" (Kenny Loggins, Melissa Manchester) - 4:42
 "Holdin' on to the Lovin' " (Melissa Manchester, Allee Willis, Deniece Williams) - 3:21
 "I Know Your Love Won't Let Me Down" (Adrienne Anderson, Melissa Manchester) - 2:49
 "Lights of Dawn" (Melissa Manchester) - 3:29
2007 CD re-issue bonus tracks
 "We Had This Time" (Larry Weiss, Melissa Manchester)
 "Nice Girls" (extended version) (Jan Buckingham, Mark Grey, Steve Buckingham)
 "O Heaven (How You've Changed to Me)" (single mix) (Melissa Manchester)

Charts

Personnel
 Melissa Manchester – lead vocals, acoustic piano (10)
 Alan Feingold – keyboards
 Randy McCormick – keyboards, string arrangements (1)
 Tom Robb – bass
 Steve Tischer – bass
 James Stroud – drums, percussion 
 Mickey Buckins – percussion
 David Manchester – bassoon (7)
 Steve Dorff – string arrangements (1, 2, 4)
 Barry Fasman – string arrangements (3)
 Gene Page – string arrangements (6, 8)
 Steve Cagen – string arrangements (7)
 Sid Sharp – concertmaster (1-4, 6, 7, 8)
 Tower of Power Horns (6)
 Emilio Castillo – tenor saxophone 
 Steve "Doc" Kupka – baritone saxophone
 Lenny Pickett – alto saxophone, tenor saxophone 
 Jay Scott – alto saxophone, alto sax solo
 Mic Gillette – trombone, trumpet
 Greg Adams – trumpet, horn arrangements
 Charles Chalmers – backing vocals 
 Donna Rhodes – backing vocals
 Sandra Rhodes – backing vocals
 Paul Davis – backing vocals (2)
 Arnold McCuller – lead and backing vocals (7)

Production
 Producer – Steve Buckingham
 Engineer – Ed Seay
 Assistant Engineers – Tommy Cooper and Richard Wells
 Mastered by Glenn Meadows at Masterfonics (Nashville, Tennessee).
 Cover Coordinator – Kay Steele 
 Art Direction and Design – John Kosh
 Photography – Steve Schapiro
 Management – Michael Lippman

References

Billboard vol 91  #31 (4 August 1979).
The Windsor Star 8 December 1979 p. 34.

1979 albums
Melissa Manchester albums
albums arranged by Gene Page
albums produced by Steve Buckingham (record producer)
Arista Records albums